Provincial road N302 (N302) is a road connecting Rijksweg 7 (A7) / European route E22 (E 22) in Hoorn with A1 / E 30 near Kootwijk.

Major intersections

References

External links

302
302
302
302